André Roberto Soares da Silva or known as Beto (born 25 October 1981) is a Brazilian football player who plays as a striker most recently for Novo Hamburgo.

Career

Club
On 25 July 2003, Beto was signed by Ferro Carril Oeste. On 19 July 2005, he signed a deal until 31 December 2008 for Criciúma for which he was champion of Brazilian Série C (title won in 2006). However, on 2 January 2007, he left for Bulgaria's Litex Lovech.

He has also played for Internacional, Juventude in Brazil and Ulbra, Itual and Sero Kariu of Argentina.

In the summer of 2012 signed a contract with Khazar Lankaran. Beto had his contract with Khazar Lankaran cancelled in November 2012, after only playing 5 matches for the club.

Career statistics

Club

References

External links 
  Brazilian FA Database
 Profile at TFF
 Guardian Stats Centre

Brazilian footballers
Brazilian expatriate footballers
Ferro Carril Oeste footballers
Criciúma Esporte Clube players
PFC Litex Lovech players
Gaziantepspor footballers
Bucaspor footballers
Mersin İdman Yurdu footballers
First Professional Football League (Bulgaria) players
Süper Lig players
Expatriate footballers in Bulgaria
Expatriate footballers in Turkey
Brazilian expatriate sportspeople in Turkey
Association football forwards
Sportspeople from Santa Catarina (state)
1981 births
Living people
Brazilian expatriate sportspeople in Bulgaria